Stoyan Bobekov (born 10 November 1953) is a Bulgarian former cyclist. He competed in the individual road race and team time trial events at the 1976 Summer Olympics.

References

External links
 

1953 births
Living people
Bulgarian male cyclists
Olympic cyclists of Bulgaria
Cyclists at the 1976 Summer Olympics
Sportspeople from Plovdiv